Malaysia competed at the 2018 Winter Olympics in Pyeongchang, South Korea, from 9 to 25 February 2018. It was the country's first appearance at the Winter Olympics. Malaysia's team consisted of five people: two athletes, two officials and one chef de mission.

Competitors
The following is the list of number of competitors participating at the Games per sport/discipline.

Alpine skiing 

Malaysia has qualified a single male athlete for alpine skiing. Jeffrey Webb became the first Malaysian to qualify for the Winter Olympics. Webb was born to an American father and Malaysian mother, allowing him to compete for the country.

Figure skating 

Figure skater Julian Yee became the second Malaysian to qualify for the Winter Olympic Games by finishing among the top six skaters who had previously yet to secure qualification at the 2017 Nebelhorn Trophy.

See also
Malaysia at the 2017 Asian Winter Games
Malaysia at the 2018 Commonwealth Games

References

Nations at the 2018 Winter Olympics
2018
2018 in Malaysian sport